Korn is an American nu metal band.

Korn or KORN may refer to:
Korn (surname), and persons with the name
Korn (liquor), a type of distilled alcohol
Korn (album), by the band Korn
KORN (AM), a radio station in Mitchell, South Dakota, United States
KORN-FM, a radio station in Mitchell, South Dakota, United States
KORN, a fictional radio station from the television series Hee Haw
KornShell, a computer interface
Korn, artist in the graffiti crew Smart Crew
Korn, Japanese reggae rapper and occasional guest judge on Iron Chef
KDLT, a radio station in Sioux Falls, South Dakota, United States
Chiers, a river in Luxembourg, Belgium, and France

See also
Corn (disambiguation)
Corne (disambiguation)
Korne (disambiguation)